Jim Giles may refer to:
Jim Giles (reporter), co-founder of Matter, an online science magazine
Jim Giles (meteorologist) (1939–2006), television meteorologist in Tulsa, Oklahoma
Jimmie Giles (born 1954), American football player
Jimmy Giles (born 1946), English footballer and manager

See also
James Giles (disambiguation)